The 1985–86 St. John's Redmen basketball team represented St. John's University during the 1985–86 NCAA Division I men's basketball season. The team was coached by Lou Carnesecca in his eighteenth year at the school. St. John's home games are played at Alumni Hall and Madison Square Garden and the team is a member of the Big East Conference.

Roster

Schedule and results

|-
!colspan=9 style="background:#FF0000; color:#FFFFFF;"| Regular Season

|-
!colspan=9 style="background:#FF0000; color:#FFFFFF;"| Big East tournament

|-
!colspan=9 style="background:#FF0000; color:#FFFFFF;"| NCAA Tournament

Rankings

Awards and honors
Walter Berry – Consensus First-team All-American, Single season school record for scoring and blocks
Mark Jackson – NCAA Assists leader, Honorable Mention AP All-American, Single game and season school records for assists

Team players drafted into the NBA

References

St. John's Red Storm men's basketball seasons
St. John's
St. John's
St John
St John